Edward Henry Bonham-Carter (born 24 May 1960) is the vice chairman of a British fund management group, Jupiter Fund Management plc.

Early life 
Edward Henry Bonham-Carter was born and raised in Golders Green, London. He is the elder son of Raymond Bonham Carter, who was a merchant banker, and Elena (née Proper de Callejón), a psychotherapist of Jewish descent. He has two younger siblings: his sister is the actress Helena Bonham Carter and his brother is Thomas Bonham-Carter, who co-manages a corporate governance agency. He went to Harrow School and the University of Manchester where he studied Economics and Politics.

Career 
He was appointed chief investment officer of Jupiter Fund Management in July 1999. In 2000, he took over as joint chief executive when John Duffield left over disagreements with the management of Commerzbank. In 2007 he led a management buy-out, supported by US private equity firm TA Associates in which Jupiter staff (95% of whom bought shares in Jupiter) took a majority stake in the business.

In 2018 he joined ITV plc as a senior independent director.

In 2022, he announced his retirement from Jupiter to focus on his non-executive roles with ITV and Land Securities.

Personal life 
Edward married former Wish You Were Here? presenter Victoria Studd.  
The couple has three children:
 Harry (b.1996)
 Maud (b.1999)
 Tobias (b.2004).

See also 
Bonham Carter family

References 

1960 births
Alumni of the University of Manchester
Asquith family
English chief executives
English financial businesspeople
English Jews
English money managers
Living people
People from Golders Green
People educated at Harrow School
Edward
Fould family